Santa Olivia is a novel by Jacqueline Carey, the first in a series that is continued by Saints Astray.

Plot summary
Set in a future dystopia United States, the town of Santa Olivia is effectively a desert war zone where people have no rights and legally no longer exist, with the town's name even being changed simply to "Outpost No. 12". The main character is that of Loup Garron, a daughter of a genetically modified father who was bred by the US military as a weapon and has since escaped to Outpost. He becomes engaged with Loup's mother, a resident of Outpost, but is forced to leave before his daughter is born. Loup grows up to become a boxer in Outpost in order to try to escape and eventually find her father.

References

External links
 
 The Official Jacqueline Carey Homepage

2009 American novels
American fantasy novels
Novels about boxing
Dystopian novels